Civmec Limited is a dual-listed Singaporean-Australian public company involved in the construction, engineering and shipbuilding industries. Headquartered in Perth, Western Australia, it specialises in fabrication and construction for the oil and gas and mining industries and has been involved in a number of significant Australian mining and civil engineering projects and has been selected to build a number of vessels and facilities for the Royal Australian Navy.

History

Civmec was established in 1990, becoming part of the VDM Group in 2006. In 2009, it was sold in a management buyout. It was listed on the Singapore Exchange in 2012, and became a dual-listed company when listed on the Australian Securities Exchange on 22 June 2018.

Civmec's main facilities are in Henderson and Newcastle and it has satellite offices in Gladstone and Singapore. The Henderson headquarters sits on 120,000 square metres of land, and its fabrication plant is the largest in the southern hemisphere. An expansion to the shipbuilding and maintenance facility in 2018 and 2019 resulted in an undercover facility with 53,000 square metres of space, which is the largest in Australia.

Up until 2015, Civmec had largely concentrated on mining and energy-based projects, holding engineering contracts for Shell Australia's Prelude floating liquefied natural gas facility, Chevron Corporation's Gorgon and Wheatstone gas facilities, Inpex's Ichthys gas field and Woodside Petroleum's Persephone project. Around this time, although the company's mining-based contracts continued, the company diversified its work and moved to infrastructure-based projects. Since this time it has undertaken the construction of a number of significant infrastructure projects in Perth as well as commenced military projects.

In November 2015, Civmec agreed terms to purchase Forgacs Marine & Defence. The company saw the purchase as an opportunity to set up a facility on Australia's east coast, and to pursue opportunities to enter into military contracts for submarines, offshore patrol boats and frigates for the Royal Australian Navy (RAN). The purchase, which included the Forgacs Shipyard in Tomago, New South Wales, was completed in February 2016 and resulted in over 150 job losses.

In 2018, Civmec commenced building ten of the Arafura-class offshore patrol vessels for the RAN, and in 2020 commenced building the RAN's new submarine rescue at its Henderson facility, which will include a launch and recovery system, hyperbaric treatment unit, and maintenance training and testing infrastructure with a seven-metre deep pool. This facility is due for completion in February 2021.

Notable projects
Elizabeth Quay pedestrian footbridge
Perth Stadium, supply and installation of steelwork
Matagarup Bridge fabrication and painting
The Kids' Bridge

References

Companies based in Perth, Western Australia
Companies listed on the Australian Securities Exchange
Companies listed on the Singapore Exchange
Construction and civil engineering companies of Australia
Dual-listed companies
Shipbuilding companies of Australia
1990 establishments in Australia